"Is This Love" is a song by British-American rock band Whitesnake. It was released in 1987 as the second single from their self-titled album.

The single was a hit for Whitesnake, reaching number nine in the UK Singles Chart, and number two on the US Billboard Hot 100 singles chart where it was barred from the top spot by George Michael's smash hit "Faith", making it their second-biggest US hit after "Here I Go Again", which topped the charts. The single was reissued in 1994 to promote Whitesnake's Greatest Hits. This version reached number 25 on the UK Singles Chart.

"Is This Love" has been a mainstay in Whitesnake's live shows since 1987. As such, it is featured on several of their live albums, including Live: In the Shadow of the Blues (2006) and Live at Donington 1990 (2011). John Sykes played it live in 2004 (Bad Boy Live!). In 2015, Classic Rock magazine ranked it as 7th on their Top 40 greatest power ballads list.

Background and writing
The power ballad was written by vocalist David Coverdale and guitarist John Sykes during the album's early writing process (which took place in the south of France), but it was long rumoured that the song had originally been written for Tina Turner. Coverdale confirmed these rumours in the booklet of Whitesnakes 20th anniversary edition, by saying.

Before I'd left [for the south of France] a friend at EMI had asked me for any ideas that would work for Tina Turner. So that was where the original idea for "Is This Love" came from.

However, according to Coverdale, when David Geffen heard it he was told to keep it and so kept it for Whitesnake.

Music video
A music video was also made, featuring Coverdale's then-girlfriend actress Tawny Kitaen. The music video, which was directed by Marty Callner, depicts the band playing the song on a misty stage, intercut with scenes of Coverdale singing, Kitaen dancing and the two of them together. Due to Coverdale firing the other members of the band before the album was released, he is the only Whitesnake member present on both the recording and in the music video; this was the case for all music videos released for songs from the 1987 album (except for "Here I Go Again", Vandenberg performed the guitar solo on the recording and later appeared in the music video as well).

Commercial performance
"Is This Love" reached number 13 on Billboards Mainstream Rock chart. It also peaked at number 38 on the Adult Contemporary chart in the US; despite this, in the years since, "Here I Go Again", which did not chart on the AC chart at the time of its release, gets more airplay on adult contemporary stations, most notably iHeartRadio-owned stations.

Track listings
All songs were written by David Coverdale and John Sykes, except where noted.

UK (EMI) single
 "Is This Love" – 4:48
 "Standing in the Shadow" – 3:53 (Coverdale)*
 "Need Your Love So Bad" – 3:21 (Little Willie John)*

US (Geffen) single
 "Is This Love" – 4:48
 "Bad Boys" – 4:09

*The B-sides that appeared on EMI editions of the single were new 1987 re-recordings of earlier tracks by the band, although they were not advertised as such on the packaging. Both re-recorded versions would later feature on the 1987 Versions EP.

Personnel
 David Coverdale – lead vocals
 John Sykes – guitar, backing vocals
 Neil Murray – bass guitar
 Aynsley Dunbar – drums
 Don Airey – keyboards

Charts

Weekly charts

Year-end charts

Certifications

References

External links
Is This Love 2018 Official Video Remix at official YouTube channel WhitesnakeTV
Is This Love 2020 HD at official YouTube channel WhitesnakeTV

1980s ballads
1987 singles
Whitesnake songs
Songs written by David Coverdale
Song recordings produced by Keith Olsen
Songs written by John Sykes
Song recordings produced by Mike Stone (record producer)
Geffen Records singles
EMI Records singles
Glam metal ballads
Music videos directed by Marty Callner
British soft rock songs